Mark S. King (born December 23, 1960) is an American HIV/AIDS activist, blogger, writer, and actor. King tested positive for HIV in 1985 and became an HIV/AIDS activist soon after. In 2020, the Association of LGBTQ Journalists presented King with the Sarah Pettit Memorial Award for the LGBTQ Journalist of the Year. He is the creator of the video blog My Fabulous Disease, which won the 2020 GLAAD Media Award for Outstanding Blog. Out magazine named King to its 2020 Out100 list of LGBTQ+ influencers.

Early life 
Mark King, one of six siblings, was born on December 23, 1960, to a military family that settled in Shreveport, Louisiana. He graduated from the University of Houston in 1981.

Career 
Following college, King went to Hollywood to pursue a career in acting, and appeared in television commercials. While in California, he also owned and operated a gay fantasy phone service, Telerotic. His memoir, A Place Like This, focuses on his time in Los Angeles during the early years of the AIDS pandemic.

After King tested HIV positive in 1985, he became an AIDS activist, and was the first public relations director for the Los Angeles Shanti Foundation. He later served as director of education and communication for AID Atlanta.

King publishes a video blog, My Fabulous Disease, the subjects of which include HIV and AIDS, LGBTQ+ issues, substance abuse, politics, sex, and his own family. King advocates against HIV criminalization and is a proponent of U=U (undetectable = untransmittable) and the use of PrEP.

In 2020 My Fabulous Disease received the GLAAD Media Award for outstanding blog, its fifth nomination.  He was named 2020's LGBTQ Journalist of the Year by the Association of LGBTQ Journalists.

King has presented at, and reported on, regional, national, and international HIV/AIDS conferences, including the International AIDS Conference. His coverage of AIDS2016 in Durban, South Africa, was featured in materials for the Elizabeth Taylor AIDS Foundation.

King's articles, blog entries, videos, and commentaries have appeared in Huffpost, TheBody.com, The Advocate, and Poz Magazine, among others. He has been interviewed or cited on NBC, CNN, NPR, Salon, and the Washington Post. He also participated in the original "Let's Stop HIV Together" campaign launched in 2012 by the Centers for Disease Control.

In 2013, HIV Equal included him in a list of thirteen notable HIV/AIDS activists.

Personal life 
King tested positive for HIV in 1985, the year testing became publicly available. King is openly gay, and is also open about his addiction to alcohol and drugs, particularly crystal methamphetamine. According to HuffPost, he has slept with close to 10,000 men. He has been sober since 2012. In 2015 he married Michael Mitchell.

Selected publications 
 A Place Like This: A Memoir (2007)
 "Suicide, A Love Story," in Shades of Blue, Amy Ferris, ed. (2015)
 My Fabulous Disease (video blog)
 "David Furnish talks Sir Elton, PrEP and U=U at AIDS2018 Confab," Queerty, August 1, 2018 (interviewing David Furnish)
 "Finding Larry Kramer," Poz Magazine, May 15, 2018 (interviewing Larry Kramer)

Films and television 
 Featured participant, Meth (2006)
 Producer, actor, Merce, Seasons 1 & 2
 Contestant,  The Price is Right (1980)

Selected conferences 
 2018 OHTN Research Conference, Toronto, ON (plenary speaker)
 2018 United States Conference on AIDS (plenary speaker)
 2015 NLGJA Conference (plenary panel moderator)
 2013 ADAP Advocacy Association Annual Conference (panelist)

Awards and recognition 
 2020—Named to the Out (magazine) 2020 Out100 List,
2020—Outstanding Blog, GLAAD Media Award, for My Fabulous Disease (nominated in 2015, 2017, 2018, 2019, and 2020.).
 2020—Sarah Pettit Memorial Award for the LGBTQ Journalist of the Year, Association of LGBTQ Journalists.
 2014, 2016, 2020 – Excellence in Blogging Award, National Lesbian & Gay Journalists Association, First place, for My Fabulous Disease
 2013 – Listed in "Legendary Activists in the Fight Against AIDS" in HIV Equal
 2013 – Selected as a Grand Marshall for Atlanta Pride Parade
 2011, 2018 – Listed in Poz Magazine's "Poz 100"
 2010 – Included in "The Best of 'It Gets Better'", The Advocate, October 4, 2010

References

External links 
http://marksking.com
https://www.youtube.com/user/MyFabulousDisease
Bonus Track: Mark S. King (interview of King by Gillian Frank on the podcast, "Sexting History.")
"Though Not A Death Sentence, HIV/AIDS Still Holds A Powerful Stigma," Rachel Martin, Weekend Edition Sunday (NPR), August 16, 2015 (interview)
"Living Positive with HIV." (CNN interview with Don Lemon)

1960 births
Living people
American gay writers
HIV/AIDS activists
Gay memoirists
People with HIV/AIDS
University of Houston alumni